Dhirasram Railway Station is a railway station located in the metropolis of Gazipur District of Dhaka Division, Bangladesh.

History 
The demand for jute was increasing all over the world. For the purpose of meeting that growing demand, there was a need for better communication system than the existing communication system to supply jute from Eastern Bengal to Port of Kolkata. Therefore in 1885 a 144 km wide meter gauge railway line named Dhaka State Railway was constructed to bring raw jute to Kolkata mainly by river which connects Mymensingh with Narayanganj. Gandaria railway station was built as part of the project during the construction of Narayanganj–Bahadurabad Ghat line. At that time Dhirasram railway station was built as a station of this line. In 2003, an inland container depot was planned to be constructed at this railway station after shifting it from Kamalapur railway station. 100 acres of land was acquired in the railway station area which is located near Demra–Joydebpur Eastern Bypass for the implementation of the project. In 2019, the government contracted DP World to build it under a public private partnership, after failing to find investors to implement the project.

References

External link 
 

Gazipur Sadar Upazila
Railway stations in Gazipur District
Railway stations opened in 1885
1885 establishments in British India